In the culinary arts, fond is a contraction of fonds de cuisine which is loosely described as "the foundation and working capital of the kitchen". It refers to a flavorful liquid that is used as foundation (fondation in French, hence the abbreviation fond) for other preparations, such as stocks, broths, gravies and sauces.
 
In popular usage, the word fond is often conveniently used to refer to the stock made from a fond. It is also sometime used colloquially to refer to the solid bits of food found stuck to a pan after something was cooked; more technically, these bits are deglazed with a liquid in order to produce a fond.

References

 
Sauces
Cooking techniques
Culinary terminology